Powys is a county and preserved county in Wales. It is named after the Kingdom of Powys which was a Welsh successor state, petty kingdom and principality that emerged during the Middle Ages following the end of Roman rule in Britain.

Geography 

Powys covers the historic counties of Montgomeryshire and Radnorshire, most of Brecknockshire, and part of historic Denbighshire. It is bounded to the north by Gwynedd, Denbighshire and Wrexham County Borough; to the west by Ceredigion and Carmarthenshire; to the east by Shropshire and Herefordshire; and to the south by Rhondda Cynon Taf, Merthyr Tydfil County Borough, Caerphilly County Borough, Blaenau Gwent, Monmouthshire and Neath Port Talbot.

The largest towns are Newtown, Ystradgynlais, Brecon, Welshpool, Llandrindod Wells and Knighton. Powys has the lowest population density of all the principal areas of Wales. Most of Powys is mountainous, and most roads and railways are relatively slow.

Just under a third of the residents have Welsh linguistic skills: Welsh speakers are concentrated mainly in the rural areas both in and around Machynlleth, Llanfyllin and Llanrhaeadr-ym-Mochnant (where William Morgan first translated the whole Bible into Welsh in 1588) in Montgomeryshire, and the industrial area of Ystradgynlais in the southwest of Brecknockshire. Radnorshire was almost completely anglicised by the end of the 18th century. The 2001 census records show 21% of the population of Powys were able to speak Welsh at that time, the same as for the whole of Wales.

History

The county is named after the ancient Welsh Kingdom of Powys, which in the sixth century AD included the northern two-thirds of the area as well as most of Shropshire and adjacent areas now in England, and came to an end when it was occupied by Llywelyn ap Gruffudd of Gwynedd during the 1260s.

The uplands retain evidence of occupation from long before the Kingdom of Powys, and before the Romans, who built roads and forts across the area. There are 1130 identified burial mounds within the county, of varying styles and ages, dating from 4000 BC to 1000 BC, most of them belonging to the Bronze Age. Of these, 339 are scheduled monuments. Standing stones, most again dating to the Bronze Age, also occur in large numbers, 276 being found across the county, of which 92 are scheduled. From the Iron Age, the county has 90 scheduled hillforts and a further 54 enclosures and settlement sites.

Powys is served by the Cambrian Line and Heart of Wales line which offer connections to major towns and cities such as Swansea, Wrexham, Shrewsbury, Birmingham, Wolverhampton, Manchester, Cardiff, Aberystwyth, London and Telford. The county used to be served by key railways such as the Mid-Wales Railway, Oswestry and Newtown Railway, Tanat Valley Light Railway, Llanfyllin Branch, Leominster and Kington Railway, Swansea Vale Railway and the Hereford, Hay and Brecon Railway, all of which offered connections to South Wales, Hereford, Oswestry, North Wales and West Wales but have all since closed.

Heraldry

The gold in the county coat of arms symbolises the wealth of the area. Black is for both mining and the Black Mountains. The fountain is a medieval heraldic charge displayed as a roundel barry wavy argent and azure. It represents water and refers to both the water catchment area and the rivers and lakes. Thus, the arms contain references to the hills and mountains, rivers and lakes, water supply and industry.
The crest continues the colouring of the arms. A tower has been used in preference to a mural crown, which alludes to the county's military history and remains. From the tower rises a red kite, a bird almost extinct elsewhere in Britain but thriving in Powys. The bird is a "semé of black lozenges" for the former coal mining industry, while the golden fleece it carries is a reference to the importance of sheep rearing in the county.

The county motto is: Powys – the paradise of Wales.

Government

On 1 April 1974, Powys was created under the Local Government Act 1972. At first, the former administrative counties of Montgomery, Radnor, and Brecknock were districts within it. On 1 April 1996, the districts were abolished, and Powys was reconstituted as a unitary authority.  There was a minor border adjustment in the northeastspecifically, the addition of the communities of Llansilin and Llangedwyn from Glyndŵr district in Clwydand with moving the border, so that rather than half of Llanrhaeadr-ym-Mochnant, all is included.

The first Lord Lieutenant of Powys was previously the Lord Lieutenant of Montgomeryshire.  The Lord Lieutenant of Brecknockshire and Lord Lieutenant of Radnorshire were appointed as lieutenants. The present lord lieutenant is Shân Legge-Bourke of Crickhowell.

Attractions

 Black Mountains
 Brecon Beacons – a mountain range
 Radnor Forest
 Y Gaer – a Roman fort
 Battle of Bryn Glas

Castles
 Dolforwyn Castle
 Montgomery Castle
 Powis Castle
 Tretower Castle
 Aberedw Castle
 Castell Du
 Bronllys Castle
 Cefnllys Castle

Lakes, reservoirs and waterfalls
 Elan Valley Reservoirs
 Lake Vyrnwy
 Llangorse Lake
 Clywedog Reservoir
 Pistyll y Llyn – one of the highest waterfalls in Wales
 Pistyll Rhaeadr
 Water-breaks-its-neck – waterfall in Radnor Forest
 Waterfall Country – waterfalls on the upper tributaries of the River Neath

Cathedral
 Brecon Cathedral

Cave systems
 Ogof Agen Allwedd
 Ogof Craig a Ffynnon
 Ogof Ffynnon Ddu
 Ogof y Daren Cilau

Museums and exhibitions
 Centre for Alternative Technology, Machynlleth
 Llandrindod Wells Museum
 National Cycle Museum, Llandrindod Wells
 Llanidloes Museum
 Knighton Museum, Knighton
 Newtown Textile Museum
 Powysland Museum, Welshpool
 Judge's Lodging, Presteigne
 The Old Bell Museum, Montgomery
 Robert Owen Museum, Newtown
 Rhayader Museum & Gallery, Rhayader
 Wyeside Arts Centre, Builth Wells
 Y Gaer, Brecon
 Llanwrtyd Wells Heritage and Arts Centre, Llanwrtyd Wells

Walks
 Glyndŵr's Way – a  extended loop through Powys between Knighton and Welshpool
 Sarn Sabrina Walk – a  circular walking route from Llanidloes to the source of the River Severn
 Severn Way – described by the Long Distance Walkers Association as a  waymarked long-distance trail
 Taff Trail – walking and cycle path that runs for 55 miles (89 km) between Cardiff Bay and Brecon
 Offa's Dyke Path – a long-distace footpath about 177-mile (285 km)

Railways
 Brecon Mountain Railway (heritage line)
 Cambrian Line (main line)
 Heart of Wales line (main line)
 Welshpool & Llanfair Light Railway (heritage line)

Fairtrade
In December 2007, Powys was awarded Fair Trade County status by The Fairtrade Foundation.

See also
 List of Lord Lieutenants of Powys
 List of High Sheriffs of Powys
 List of schools in Powys
 List of churches in Powys

References

External links

 
 
 Powys Heritage
 Tourism in Powys

 
Counties of Wales
Principal areas of Wales
Preserved counties of Wales
Rally GB